The Israeli Men's Volleyball First League is the most important Israeli men's volleyball competition organized by the Israeli Volleyball Association ( איגוד הכדורעף בישראל, IVA ), it was established in 1956.

History
The 2018/19 Edition of the Israeli Volleyball Premier League was attended by 8 teams: "Hapoel (Matte Asher), Hapoel (Kfar Sava), Maccabi (Tel Aviv), Hapoel Menashe-Hadera (Emek-Hefer), Maccabi (Hod-Ha Sharon), Ilabon, Elitzur-Carmel (Kohav-Yair-Tzur-Igal), KK (Tel Aviv). The championship title for the 2nd time in a row was won by the team Hapoel (Mate-Ascher), which won the final series beating Hapoel (Kfar Sava) 3-1 (3:1, 1:3, 3:0, 3:1). The 3rd place went to Maccabi (Tel Aviv).

Winners list

References

External links
 Israeli Volleyball Association 

Israel
Volleyball in Israel
Professional sports leagues in Israel